Bridget Pettis (born January 1, 1971) was an Assistant Coach of the Chicago Sky Women's National Basketball Association (WNBA) professional basketball team. She is an American former college and professional basketball player who was a guard in the WNBA for eight seasons during the 1990s and 2000s. Pettis played college basketball for the University of Florida, and professionally for the Phoenix Mercury and the Indiana Fever of the WNBA.

Early years 

Pettis was born in East Chicago, Indiana. She attended East Chicago Central High School, and played high school basketball for the EC Central Cardinals.

College career 

Pettis attended Central Arizona College in Coolidge, Arizona, and played junior college basketball for the Central Arizona Vaqueras. She accepted an athletic scholarship to transfer to the University of Florida in Gainesville, Florida, where she played for coach Carol Ross's Florida Gators women's basketball team from 1991 to 1993. Memorably, she completed eight three-point shots against the Georgia Bulldogs on January 20, 1993—still the Gators' single-game record.

She graduated from the University of Florida with a bachelor's degree in 1993.

Professional career 

The Phoenix Mercury selected Pettis in the first round (seventh pick overall) of the 1997 WNBA Draft. She played for the Mercury from 1997 to 2001, the Indiana Fever in 2002 and 2003, and the Mercury again in 2006. Her first two seasons with the Mercury were the most productive, when she started fifty-six of sixty games played, and averaged over fourteen point per game. In her eight-season WNBA career, she played in 228 games, started seventy-one of them, and scored 1,408 points.

In 2013, Pettis and Frank and Eddie Johnson started a club team called Team 2j Thunder. Three months later, Pettis was hired as an assistant coach for the LA Sparks.

On March 6, 2014 Pettis was named Assistant Coach for the Dallas Wings. In October, 2017 (after 4 seasons) Pettis announced her retirement from the Wings organization.

On January 23, 2019 Coach Pettis returned from retirement to accept a position as Assistant Coach with the Chicago Sky of the WNBA.

Prior to the 2020 season, Coach Pettis left coaching to focus on her Nonprofit organization Project Roots.

See also 

 List of Florida Gators in the WNBA
 List of University of Florida alumni

References

External links 
 Bridget Pettis – Official WNBA player profile

1971 births
Living people
American expatriate basketball people in Italy
American expatriate basketball people in Turkey
American women's basketball coaches
American women's basketball players
Basketball coaches from Indiana
Basketball players from Indiana
Chicago Sky coaches
Dallas Wings coaches
Florida Gators women's basketball players
Guards (basketball)
Indiana Fever players
Junior college women's basketball players in the United States
LGBT basketball players
LGBT people from Indiana
Lesbian sportswomen
Phoenix Mercury players
Sportspeople from East Chicago, Indiana
Tulsa Shock coaches